Methodist Ladies' College (or M.L.C.) is the name of several independent girls' schools affiliated with the Uniting Church or the Methodist Church. 

Methodist Ladies' College, Melbourne, Kew, Victoria
Methodist Ladies' College, Perth, Claremont, Western Australia

Schools formerly called Methodist Ladies' College
Annesley College, Adelaide, South Australia
Penrhos College, Perth, Western Australia
MLC School, Burwood, (Sydney), New South Wales

Schools formed by merging with a Methodist Ladies' College
Scotch Oakburn College, Tasmania (Amalgamation of Methodist Ladies' College, Oakburn College and Scotch College)
Cato College (formerly Methodist Ladies' College, Elsternwick, Victoria),  integrated into Wesley College, Melbourne over the period 1986–1989

See also
Methodist Girls' School (disambiguation)
MLC (disambiguation)

Educational institution disambiguation pages